Stelis roseopunctata is a species of flowering plant in the family Orchidaceae, native to Colombia, Ecuador and Venezuela. It was first described by John Lindley in 1846 as Pleurothallis roseopunctata and transferred to Stelis by Rodrigo Bernal in 2015. Stelis elegans (Kunth) Pridgeon & M.W.Chase is a synonym of Stelis roseopunctata; Stelis elegans Luer & R.Vásquez is a separate species.

References

roseopunctata
Flora of Colombia
Flora of Ecuador
Flora of Venezuela
Plants described in 1846